Ireland has participated in the Junior Eurovision Song Contest seven times since their first appearance at the . Irish-language broadcaster TG4 has been responsible for the country's participation in the contest, and organises a televised national final  to select the Irish entries.

Since their debut, Ireland has placed in the top 10 twice: in  when the song "" performed by Zena Donnelly placed 10th out of 17 participating countries, and in 2022 when "" by Sophie Lennon placed 4th out of 16 participants.

History

TG4 originally intended to make their debut in the  contest in Marsa, Malta, but required funding from the Broadcasting Authority of Ireland, which was rejected.

Ireland debuted in the contest when TG4 participated in the  contest in Sofia, Bulgaria, when the song "Réalta na mara" performed by Aimee Banks placed 12th in a field of 17 countries.

Despite having initially confirmed their participation in the  contest in Warsaw, Poland in January 2020, TG4 announced in August 2020 that they would not participate in the contest due to the COVID-19 pandemic. In February 2021, TG4 confirmed their participation in the  contest in France.

Junior Eurovision Éire

Junior Eurovision Éire is an Irish television show which has served as Ireland's national final for the Junior Eurovision Song Contest since the country's debut in 2015. The show was hosted by Eoghan McDermott from 2015-2019. Between 2015 and 2018, the show selected both the song and the artist, while in 2019 and 2021 the show selected only the artist, and the song was selected internally. 

McDermott stepped down from the programme in 2021, and was replaced by Louise Cantillon.

Participation overview

Commentators and spokespersons

Gallery

See also
Ireland in the Eurovision Song Contest
Ireland in the Eurovision Dance Contest
Ireland in the Eurovision Young Dancers
Ireland in the Eurovision Young Musicians

Notes and references

Notes

References

 
Countries in the Junior Eurovision Song Contest